Yarmouth railway station, was an intermediate  station of the  Freshwater, Yarmouth and Newport Railway.

History
It was incorporated  in 1860, opened over a ten-month period between 1888 and 1889 and closed 65 years later. Situated on the outskirts of the town ) it was one of the more economically viable stations on a generally unprofitable  line. Until the 1920s there was a lengthy passing loop and second (staggered) platform. The former station building was for a period used as a Youth Club, and is now (as of 2022) a restaurant. It is still very recognisable as a FYNR station.

Stationmasters

George William Ranger until ca. 1891 (afterwards station master at Cowes)
Robert White ca. 1898 ca. 1909
Henry George Spinks ca. 1910 - 1911 (injured during a shunting accident resulting in the amputation of his arm)
Henry William Hodges 1911 - 1924
Charles Dennett 1924 - 1930 (formerly station master at St Lawrence and Ventnor West, afterwards station master at Gosport)
A.W. Young ca. 1936 ca. 1937

See also 

 List of closed railway stations in Britain

References

External links 
 Yarmouth station on navigable 1946 O. S. map

Disused railway stations on the Isle of Wight
Former Freshwater, Yarmouth and Newport Railway stations
Railway stations in Great Britain opened in 1889
Railway stations in Great Britain closed in 1953
Railway station